Thomas Vogel (born March 1, 1967 in Hanover) is a German former professional footballer who played as a defender or midfielder.

Honours
 Bundesliga third place: 1995

References

1967 births
Living people
Association football midfielders
German footballers
TSV Havelse players
SC Freiburg players
Hamburger SV players
Borussia Mönchengladbach players
VfR Mannheim players
Bundesliga players
Footballers from Hanover